Splendrillia biconica is a species of sea snail, a marine gastropod mollusk in the family Drilliidae.

Description
The length of the shell attains 18.6 mm.

Distribution
This marine species was found in the Lower Mare formation on Isla Margarita, Venezuela. It was described as a fossil. It was also found in the eastern part of Panama.

References

 Weisbord, N. E. 1962. Late Cenozoic gastropods from northern Venezuela. Bulletins of American Paleontology 42(193) 672 pp., 48 pls.

External links

biconica
Invertebrates of Venezuela